Belmont Hotel or Bellmont Hotel may refer to:

Belmont Hotel (Missoula, Montana), listed on the NRHP in Montana
Belmont Hotel (Belmont, New York), listed on the NRHP in New York
Belmont Hotel (Madison, Wisconsin), listed on the NRHP in Wisconsin
Belmont Hotel (Pardeeville, Wisconsin), listed on the NRHP in Wisconsin